The men's shot put event  at the 1979 European Athletics Indoor Championships was held on 24 February in Vienna.

Results

References

Shot put at the European Athletics Indoor Championships
Shot